, also known as The Wind of Amnesia in Australia and the United Kingdom, is a Japanese novel authored by Hideyuki Kikuchi, originally published in 1983 by Asahi Sonorama. An anime film adaptation was released theatrically on December 22, 1990, directed by Kazuo Yamazaki. An English adaptation of the film was produced and released by Manga Entertainment on home video in Australia and the UK and by Central Park Media in North America.

Plot
In the year 1999, the world has been reduced to an apocalyptic wasteland due to an inexplicable gust of wind that wiped even the most basic memories, such as speech and civility, from the minds of the world's populace. Wataru befriends a young man named Johnny who, prior to the incident, was part of a government experiment designed to expand the memory capacity of the human mind and, therefore, was able to retain his memories. Johnny helps Wataru regain his speech and teaches him other basic functions. However, as a result of the physical toll his body endured due to the government experiments, Johnny dies after encouraging Wataru to travel the world.

Wataru encounters a strange woman named Sophia after she helps him escape from an encounter with an unmanned Police Mech Unit and  agrees to take Sophia to New York City. Together the two travel to Los Angeles where they help save Sue and her father, Little John, from a mob. Sue was to be offered as a bride to appease a "god", which in reality is a Construction Mech controlled by a man, but fled to escape her fate. However, upon realizing that if she were not sacrificed another woman would be in her stead, she flees from the group to rejoin her tribe. Wataru destroys the Construction Mech but Sue is killed in the conflict. Little John remains in Los Angeles to keep order of the tribe and rebuild society.

Wataru and Sophia resume their travels only to be attacked once more by the Police Mech. Sophia rescues Wataru and brings him to an advanced city called Eternal Town for medical attention. When Wataru regains consciousness, he discovers that the city is run by a super computer that has brainwashed two of its original citizens into running the day-to-day operations of the city. The super computer attempts to persuade Sophia and Wataru into becoming citizens as well but the two escape with one of the original citizens, Lisa. As they depart from the city, Lisa begins to recall memories from her past including the fact that the other citizen who was brainwashed into running the city was her father. As a result, Lisa decides to remain in Eternal Town. Sophia then explains that she is a member of an alien race that is responsible for the wind that erased Earth's citizens' memories. Sophia makes a wager with Wataru that if he is able to convince another person to join him in his travels, she will return humanity's memory.

Wataru and Sophia are chased across the country by the unrelenting Police Mech until they reach New York City. Upon arriving, Wataru drops Sophia off in order to defeat the Police Mech by himself. After destroying the Police Mech, Sophia saves Wataru as he falls from a building, and later the two kiss and have sex. Sophia leaves in order to rejoin her race and convince them that humanity deserves to have their memories.

Novel
 Japanese Version
Title: 
Writer: Hideyuki Kikuchi
Artist: Yoshitaka Amano
Cover Artist: Yoshitaka Amano
Publication Date: October 31, 1983

 English Version
Title: A Wind Named Amnesia/Invader Summer
Cover Artist: Yoshitaka Amano
Publication Date: December 23, 2009

Movie

Voice cast

Staff
Original Novel/Story: Hideyuki Kikuchi
Licensors: Central Park Media, Manga Entertainment Ltd. (Australia and UK)
Producer: Tadao Masumizu, Tomirou Kuriyama, Shin Seya
Executive producer: Kosuke Kuri 
Director: Kazuo Yamazaki
Setting: Masao Maruyama
Script: Kazuo Yamazaki, Yoshiaki Kawajiri & Kenji Kurata
Supervisors: Rintaro & Yoshiaki Kawajiri
Character Design: Satoru Makamura
Art Director: Koseki Mutsuo
Mechanical Design: Morifumi Naka
Design of “Guardian”: Yoshitaka Amano
Production: Madhouse
Original Music: Hidenobu Takimoto & Kazuhiko Toyama

Reception
The film has garnered some praise years after its initial release. Raphael See of THEM Anime Reviews called the film a sleeper hit and "one of the best titles I've never heard of." Anime News Network in their review considered the film a classic, although noting the ending was weak. Bamboo Dong in her review wrote "Without a doubt, A Wind Named Amnesia is one of the most unique and creative post-apocalyptic tales ever woven. " Critics have praised the production values of the film, and generally considered it thought-provoking and cerebral. The original novel the film is based on has also recently received some praise. Fred Patten regards the novel as being derivative of Rebirth by Thomas Calvert McClary.

References

External links

1983 Japanese novels
1990 films
1990 anime films
Fiction set in 1999
1990s science fiction films
Action anime and manga
Adventure anime and manga
Central Park Media
Dark Horse Comics titles
Discotek Media
Japanese post-apocalyptic films
Drama anime and manga
Films set in New York City
Films set in San Francisco
Films set in the United States
Films set in Washington, D.C.
Madhouse (company)
Mecha anime and manga
Novels by Hideyuki Kikuchi
Post-apocalyptic anime and manga
Animated post-apocalyptic films
Post-apocalyptic novels